The Clements Hills AVA is an American Viticultural Area located in San Joaquin County, California. It is located in the southeast part of the larger Lodi AVA. A variety of microclimates exist within the hills of the region. The soils in the area includes loams, clay loams, and clays. Below the alluvial top soil are areas of granite and volcanic soils.

References

American Viticultural Areas
American Viticultural Areas of California
Geography of San Joaquin County, California
2006 establishments in California